Jørn Aksel Krog (11 April 1948 – 3 March 2015) was a Norwegian civil servant.

He was born in Trondheim. He was secretary general of Norges Fiskarlag from 1979 to 1983, and manager of Feitsildfiskernes Salgslag from 1983 to 1989. From 1999 to 2011 he was permanent under-secretary of State in the Ministry of Fisheries and Coastal Affairs. He served as County Governor of Sør-Trøndelag from 2011 until his death in 2015.

References

1948 births
2015 deaths
People from Trondheim
Norwegian civil servants
County governors of Norway
Recipients of the Order of the Cross of Terra Mariana, 2nd Class